Isabella Malgioglio is an Australian cricketer who currently plays for New South Wales in the Women's National Cricket League (WNCL). She plays as a right-arm leg break bowler.

Domestic career
Malgioglio plays grade cricket for Parramatta District Cricket Club.

In February 2023, Malgioglio was named in a New South Wales squad for the first time. She made her debut for the side on 10 February 2022, against Australian Capital Territory, where she took 2/58 from her 10 overs. She played one further match for the side that season, taking one more wicket.

References

External links

Living people
Date of birth missing (living people)
Year of birth missing (living people)
Place of birth missing (living people)
Australian women cricketers
New South Wales Breakers cricketers